Trichophoropsis is a genus of bristle flies in the family Tachinidae. There are about five described species in Trichophoropsis.

Species
These five species belong to the genus Trichophoropsis:
 Trichophoropsis bicolor Gonzalez, 1992
 Trichophoropsis coscaroni Gonzalez, 1992
 Trichophoropsis nitens Townsend, 1914
 Trichophoropsis puna Townsend, 1914
 Trichophoropsis sabroskyi Cortes & Campos, 1971

References

Further reading

 
 
 

Tachinidae